Alfred A. Lama (1899 – January 3, 1984) was an Italian-born American architect and politician. He served as a Democratic member of the New York State Assembly from 1942 to 1972, representing portions of Brooklyn.

Early life
Lama was born in 1899 in Italy. He emigrated to the United States with his family in 1904, settling in Brooklyn, New York City.

Lama graduated from Cooper Union with a bachelor's degree in architecture.

Career
Lama was an architect. He was the co-founder of Lama & Vassalotti, an architectural firm based in Brooklyn and Queens. In 1932, he was elected as vice president of the Architects Club of Brooklyn. He was elected as the president of the Brooklyn Society of Architects in 1941.

Lama served as a Democratic member of the New York State Assembly from 1943 to 1972, representing Brooklyn. He was the co-founder of the Mitchell-Lama Housing Program.

Personal life, death and legacy
With his wife Marie, he had a son, Alfred M. Lama. They resided in Oakdale, New York.

Lama died on January 3, 1984, at St. Francis Hospital in Flower Hill, New York. His funeral was held at the St. John Nepomucene Roman Catholic Church in Bohemia, New York.

Lama Court, a small lane in Brooklyn, was named in his honor when he was an architect before he ran for office.

References

1899 births
1984 deaths
Italian emigrants to the United States
People from Brooklyn
People from Suffolk County, New York
Cooper Union alumni
Architects from New York City
Democratic Party members of the New York State Assembly